An earnings call is a teleconference, or webcast, in which a public company discusses the financial results of a reporting period ("earnings guidance"). The name comes from earnings per share (EPS), the bottom line number in the income statement divided by the number of shares outstanding.  The US-based National Investor Relations Institute (NIRI) says that 92% of companies represented by their members conduct earnings calls and that virtually all of these are webcast.  Transcripts of calls may be made available either by the company or a third party.

The calls are usually preceded or accompanied by a press release containing a summary of the financial results, and possibly by a more detailed filing under securities law.  Earnings calls usually happen, or at least begin, while the stock market on which the company's shares are traded is closed to trading, so that all investors will have had a chance to hear management's presentation before trading in the stock resumes.

Generally, the call will begin with a company official, typically the Investor Relations Officer (IRO), reading a safe harbor statement to limit the company's liability should actual results prove different from expected indicators reported in the discussion.  Then one or more company officials, often including the Chief executive officer and Chief financial officer, will discuss the operational results and financial statements for the period just ended and their outlook for the future.  The teleconference will then be opened for questions by investors, financial analysts, and other call participants.  Management will answer many of these questions, although if the data is unavailable to them they may decline or defer response.  Depending on the size and complexity of the company, the difference between actual and expected results, and other factors, the length of the call will vary.

There is no general requirement for how far in advance notice of a call must be given.  However, keeping the investor and analyst communities happy is part of management's job, so the call will generally be announced a few days or weeks in advance.  If the company has a website, then there will probably be a section titled Investor Relations or Investors, where call schedules and archived past calls will typically be posted.

Many companies are tracked by financial analysts that publish estimates of earnings per share (EPS).  The company may also provide financial guidance as to what EPS are likely to be.  If management knows that its results are going to be significantly different from its guidance or from analyst expectations, it may choose to make a preannouncement of differing results.

In 2013, the National Investor Relations Institute (NIRI) published Standards of Practice: Earnings Release Content, available to NIRI members.

United States

If the call occurs within 48 hours of a press release filed with the United States Securities and Exchange Commission (SEC) on Form 8-K and meets certain other criteria, there is no obligation to separately report the call to the SEC.  Otherwise, it must be reported on Form 8-K.  If the call contains non-Generally Accepted Accounting Principles (GAAP) information, then there are additional requirements under SEC regulations, including Regulation FD.

Companies headquartered in the United States with securities traded on a US-based stock market or other exchange are required to file audited annual reports with the SEC on Form 10-K following the end of a fiscal year and unaudited reports on Form 10-Q following the end of a fiscal quarter.  These companies announce earnings and generally hold an earnings call quarterly.

Some companies with shares traded on foreign stock exchanges also have American Depositary Receipts (ADRs) that are traded on US stock exchanges and are required to file Forms 20-F and 6K with the SEC. They are likely to have their earnings announcements and calls coordinated with the schedule required in the country where their shares are traded.

References

External links 
  Current and recent earnings calls of public U.S. companies.
  Recent earnings call transcripts.
Earnings Conference Call Best Practices. Communique Conferencing Blog. September 4, 2019.

Business terms
Teleconferencing
Corporate finance
Securities (finance)
Stock market